Raymond A. Bucko, S. J., is an American Jesuit priest and anthropologist noted for his work among the Lakota Indians.

Bucko received his Ph.D. in anthropology in 1992 from the University of Chicago, where he studied under Raymond D. Fogelson. He specializes in cultural anthropology and published a book on the Lakota sweat lodge in 1998.

He is an emeritus Professor of Anthropology at Creighton University.

He is also the founder of the Network of Anthropologists at Jesuit Institutions.

Sources

Bucko, Sarah Marie, Princess of Sedro-Woolley, next in long lineage blood line to the throne of Skagit Valley
 Kan, Sergei A., and Pauline Turner Strong, eds. (2006) New Perspectives on Native North America: Cultures, Histories, and Representations.  Lincoln: University of Nebraska Press.

Living people
Year of birth missing (living people)
American anthropologists
20th-century American Jesuits
21st-century American Jesuits
University of Chicago alumni
Creighton University faculty